This is a list of famous Armenian American musicians. For other famous Armenian Americans, see List of Armenian Americans.

Adiss Harmandian – pop singer 
Adam Najemian- Brooklyn singer/songwriter and guitarist
Alan Hovhaness – among the most prolific of 20th-century composers
Albert Asriyan – violinist, composer, arranger and band leader
Anahid Ajemian – violinist
Angel Deradoorian – experimental rock singer-songwriter, multi-instrumentailist, producer. She is known for her work with Dirty Projectors
Ani Kavafian – classical violinist
Anita Darian - soprano - vocalist - The Lion Sleeps Tonight
Ara Babajian – drummer and member of Leftöver Crack and The Slackers
Ara Berberian – operatic bass singer
Ara Dinkjian – oudist
Armand Tokatyan – operatic tenor
Armen Anassian – violinist
Armen Chakmakian – composer
Armen Donelian – jazz pianist
Armen Nalbandian – jazz pianist, and composer
Armen Ra – artist and performer 
Armenian Jazz Sextet – group playing Armenian music
Arto Tunçboyacıyan - musician
Beatrice Ohanessian – pianist, notable for being Iraq's first concert pianist and first female composer
Berj Zamkochian – organist
Bruce Nazarian – Producer, Recording Artist, Studio Musician, Composer, Lyricist. Two Billboard chart appearances as lead vocalist.
Cathy Berberian – composer, mezzo-soprano singer, and vocalist
Charles Amirkhanian – composer 
Cher –  pop singer-songwriter
Clint Bajakian – video game composer and musician
Daron Malakian – singer-songwriter, multi-instrumentalist, and record producer, lead guitarist, songwriter, and occasional vocalist of the Grammy Award-winning metal band System of a Down. He placed 30th in Guitar World's List of The 100 Greatest Heavy Metal Guitarists of All Time
David Deratzian - American Bassist and multi-instrumentalist
Dennis Agajanian – Christian musician
Derek Sherinian – among the elite rock keyboardists in the world
Dianne Goolkasian Rahbee – classical composer
Edward Manukyan – composer
Eleanor Barooshian – singer-songwriter
Eve Beglarian – composer
Grikor Suni – composer
Gerard Jirayr Svazlian – violinist
Greg Jehanian – bassist and backing vocalist, member of indie rock band mewithoutYou
Haig Mardirosian – concert organist, composer, and conductor
Haroutioun Hovanes Chakmakjian – composer
Harry Babasin – jazz bassist
Hovsep Shamlian - musician, singer-songwriter and record producer
Ida Kavafian – classical violinist and violist
Ivan Galamian – influential violin teacher of the twentieth century
Jeff Atmajian – arranger and orchestrator
Jeff Manookian - composer and conductor
John Berberian – oudist
John Dolmayan – songwriter, drummer, and member of System of a Down
John Herald – folk and bluegrass songwriter, solo and studio musician, and one-time member of The Greenbriar Boys trio
Kallen Esperian – lyric soprano
Karine Poghosyan - pianist
Kim Kashkashian – violist
Konstantin Orbelyan, Jr. – pianist, and conductor of State Academic Chamber Orchestra of Russia
Levon Ambartsumian – violinist and conductor
Lucine Amara- soprano
Maro Ajemian – pianist
Mateo Vosganian - musician, drummer, plays with Wild Adriatic
Michael Gulezian – composer and Fingerstyle guitarist
Michael Omartian – singer-songwriter, keyboardist, and music producer
Ontronik Khachaturian – singer-songwriter, multi-instrumentalist, record producer, and drummer member of System of a Down
Paul Motian – jazz drummer, percussionist and composer of Armenian extraction
Peter Dombourian – music educator, and conductor
Raffi Besalyan - pianist
Richard Hagopian – oudist, violinist, and clarinet
Richard Yardumian – classical music composer
Ross Bagdasarian, Sr. – pianist, singer, and songwriter
Roupen Altiparmakian- violinist and oudist
Şahan Arzruni – pianist, composer, and ethnomusicologist
Sato Moughalian-classical flutist
Serj Tankian – rock singer–songwriter, multi-instrumentalist, record producer, poet, philosopher and a political activist, best known as the lead vocalist, songwriter, keyboardist, and occasionally live rhythm guitarist of the Grammy Award-winning rock band, System of a Down
Shavo Odadjian – songwriter, multi-instrumentalist, music video director/editor, music producer, and artist/painter, best known as the bassist and occasional songwriter of the Grammy Award-winning rock band, System of a Down
Sib Hashian – drummer and member of the rock band Boston
Stephanie Nakasian – jazz vocalist and voice teacher
Tamar Kaprelian – singer
Tonio K – singer/songwriter

References 

Lists of American people by ethnic or national origin

Lists of American musicians